is a Japanese footballer currently playing as a midfielder for JEF United Chiba of J2 League.

Career statistics

Club
.

Notes

References

External links

1998 births
Living people
Kanto Gakuin University alumni
Japanese footballers
Association football midfielders
J2 League players
Tokyo Musashino United FC players
JEF United Chiba players